Henri Mbazumutima (born 8 March 1988) is a Burundian midfielder who played with Vital'O F.C. in the Burundi Premier League.

External links 

 

1988 births
Living people
Burundian footballers
Burundi international footballers
Association football midfielders
Burundian expatriate sportspeople in Rwanda
Burundian expatriate footballers
Rayon Sports F.C. players
Vital'O F.C. players